The Iraqi Police (IP) is the uniformed police force responsible for the enforcement of civil law in Iraq. Its organisation, structure and recruitment were guided by the Coalition Provisional Authority after the 2003 invasion of Iraq, and it is commanded by the reformed Iraqi Ministry of the Interior. "IP" refers to the Iraqi Police, and "ISF" to the broader Iraqi security forces. The current commander of the Federal Police Forces is Lieutenant General Raed Shaker Jawdat.

History 
The current Iraqi Police has some links with the pre-war Iraqi police service, which was professional and low in repression priority. Therefore, the police were expected to remain cohesive and to be a useful instrument after the invasion as well.

It was intended to form the basis for the police force of the new Iraq, but the civil disorder caused this project to be abandoned.
Following the emergency stipend payment, some police came back especially in Baghdad and the U.S. Army military police conducted emergency training. At the same time, in the south the British forces began to establish local police forces in coordination with Shiite religious leaders.

In the north, Kurdish security forces did not experience any interruption, and in Mosul a thousand former police officers were hired by Major General David Petraeus in order to maintain the public order.

In the meantime, the Coalition Provisional Authority worked with the renewed Ministry of Interior in order to purge Baathist officials (7,000 police officers fired by Bernard Kerik only in Baghdad) and to establish a police forces in short terms. In the first four months, the first training course was launched and over 4,000 officers were trained. In 2003 recruitment, applicants were mostly former soldiers and police officers who served under the Baathist rule. At the end of 2003, Iraqi Police formally totalled 50,000 officers.

Organization and oversight 

In 2009 the Iraqi Police was under the command of Major General Hussein Jassim Alawadi. The Multi-National Security Transition Command – Iraq (MNSTC-I) was a United States Central Command organisation tasked to train, mentor and equip all Iraqi civilian security forces. MNSTC-I also had the goal of training their counterparts in the Iraqi government of Iraq to assume their role. MNSTC-I was dissolved in 2010. The Iraqi Police had three main branches:
 Iraqi Police Service: Uniformed organisation tasked with the general patrol of Iraq's cities and incident response
 Federal Police: Paramilitary organisation designed to bridge the gap between the police and the army. It responds to domestic incidents beyond the capabilities of the IPS, but not severe enough for the Iraqi Army. The FP originated as the Special Police (SP) on Aug. 15, 2004 to provide national rapid-response capability to counter armed insurgency, large-scale civil disobedience and riots. In 2005, the Ministry of the Interior consolidated its ad-hoc Police Battalions into the Emergency Response Unit (a SWAT unit), the 8th Police mechanised brigade (3 motorised battalions), the Public Order Division (4 brigades/12 battalions), and the Special Police Commando Division (4 brigades/12 battalions).  It became the Iraq National Police (NP) March 30, 2006, and on August 1, 2009 the NP was renamed as the Federal Police. 

By 2012-13 there were four Federal Police Divisions, spread out around the country. The 1st and 2nd Motorized Divisions were headquartered in Baghdad and created out of the former Commando Division and the Public Order Division. The 3rd Federal Police Division, under the auspices of the Ninewa Operational Command with its headquarters in Mosul, collapsed in the ISIS 2014 Northern Iraq offensive by 9 June. The 4th Division was headquartered in Basra. Some reinforcing units, such as the 9th Brigade, 4th Federal Police Division, also withered once deployed to the front lines.
 Supporting forces: Remaining supporting organisations, primarily the Department of Border Enforcement (tasked with securing Iraq's borders and ports of entry) and the Iraqi Prison Service. The Facilities Protection Service protects buildings owned by the Iraqi government.

Uniforms 
The Iraqi Police Service uniform consists of a long-sleeved, light-blue shirt with a blue brassard on the left arm with an embroidered Iraqi flag and "Iraqi Police" embossed in English and Arabic, black or light-blue trousers or blue combat trousers similar to those of the United States Navy. They wear a dark-blue baseball cap with "POLICE" in white letters or body armour and a PASGT helmet.

Federal Police wear a black-and-blue camouflage uniform similar to the U.S. Army Combat Uniform Universal Camouflage Pattern, which includes a baseball cap, body armour and PASGT helmet. FP uniforms are issued when an officer has completed training; officers not yet trained wear a variety of uniforms, including woodland camouflage. FP officers are organised into brigades which cover geographic areas. Rank insignia for the IP is nearly identical to that of the Iraqi Army, except that the shoulder boards are usually dark blue.

Ranks 
Officers ranks and ranks of NCOs and constables are the same that of Iraqi army, from highest to lowest, with symbol on epaulette, as below:

 Major general (لواء) : one silver eagle and two silver crossed swords
 Brigadier (عميد) : one silver eagle and three silver stars
 Colonel (عقيد) : one silver eagle and two silver stars
 Lieutenant colonel (مقدم) : one silver eagle and one silver star
 Major (رائد) : one silver eagle
 Captain (نقيب) : three silver stars
 First lieutenant (ملازم اول) : two silver stars
 Lieutenant (ملازم) : one silver star

Controversy 

The Iraqi Police has faced a number of problems since it was reformed by the Coalition Provisional Authority after the fall of Baghdad. It became the target of fighters from inside and outside Iraq; thousands of officers have been killed by gunfire and bombings by Iraqi insurgents, foreign terrorists and, in some cases, friendly fire from Coalition troops. An estimated 4,250 Iraqi police officers were killed from January 2005 and 4 March 2006. Due to high unemployment in Iraq, many young Iraqi men have volunteered to join the police forces. A number of recruits have been killed by suicide bombers and suicide car bombs whilst queueing at police stations.

The IP has also been infiltrated by insurgents, who use access to privileged information, training and weapons for their own motives. Many police stations have been attacked, blown up, had weapons stolen from them and have been occupied by opponents of the Iraqi government; as a result, many police officers have abandoned their posts. As of October 7, 2006, 12,000 Iraqi Police deserted and 4,000 were killed.

On 17 August 2016, a market owner was killed by a police officer after a brawl began when the market owner "refused to back his vehicle" in Baghdad.

Sharia 
The Ba'athist regime began to increase the role of Islam in government during the early 1990s, with required religious education in the schools, honor killings and religious committees to punish those deemed in violation of traditional mores (such as adultery, fornication and homosexuality).

The Iraqi constitution stipulates Islam as the official religion, enacted laws must conform to sharia and provisions for civil rights and liberties are in accordance with public mores. Many members of the Iraqi police and Interior Ministry have ties to the Islamic fundamentalist Badr Brigade, which have been given leeway to punish those suspected of immorality. In Basra, police guarding a local park reportedly made no attempt to stop an armed group from severely beating two women and shooting a male Iraqi friend of theirs to death.

Iraqi government 
The Iraqi government has been accused of using (or allowing) the police and other groups to carry out sectarian killings and kidnappings of Sunni Iraqis. In December 2005, US troops found 625 inmates held in "very overcrowded" conditions in a Baghdad Interior Ministry building. Twelve of the prisoners reportedly had signs of torture and malnutrition. The story gave credence to the accusations, sowing further distrust of the police force. A report into the findings at the building was promised by Iraqi president Ibrahim Jaafari at the end of December 2005, but as of 4 May 2006 no report was issued.

The United States Department of State released a 2006 human rights report accusing the Iraqi police of widespread atrocities. In October of that year, the Iraqi government dismantled a police brigade with connections to sectarian death squads. The dismantled brigade was transferred to a US base for retraining. Other police brigades will be investigated for links to death squads.

Strength 
The number of police is difficult to estimate, since local police chiefs may exaggerate their numbers to obtain increased funding for their stations, and people drift in and out of service. Although the total Ministry of Interior payroll exceeds 300,000, many are off-duty at any given time. As of mid-2007, the National Police Forces employed about 25,000 officers. The number is somewhat misleading, because one-third to one-half of the NP are on leave at any given time.

Deaths 
Iraqi Interior Minister Jawad al-Bulani announced that as of December 24, 2005, 12,000 police officers in Iraq died in the line of duty since the 2003 US-led invasion.

Transition teams 
Large-scale operations were conducted by coalition forces to assist in policing and train the Iraqi Police (IP) and security forces. Police transition teams (PTTs) are US military-police squads deployed to Iraqi Police stations. The teams conduct joint patrols with the IP, share station defense and gather station information and counter-terrorism intelligence. The joint patrols of the PTTs have helped curb violence, increasing respect for Iraq's police force. These duties were later performed by United States Air Force Security Forces members. An International Police Liaison Officer (IPLO), an experienced US police officer, accompanied most of the transition teams to aid post-academy training of the IP.

National Police Transition Teams (NPTT) are 11-man military transition teams embedded in Iraqi Police units at the battalion, brigade, division and corps levels. These teams are supplied by the US Army and the US Marine Corps. Like the PTTs, each team is assisted by an IPLO and one to six local interpreters.

Equipment 
Members of the Iraqi Police use the Glock 19 and HS2000  handgun, and may carry a shotgun, Type 81, or AK-47 rifle on patrol. Iraqi Federal Police have also been seen using the Croatian-made HS Produkt VHS-2 bullpup carbine during military operations against ISIS in northern Iraq. For marine operations, the police are equipped with Safe Boat International 230 T-Top patrol boats.

See also 
 Law of Iraq
 Ministry of Interior (Iraq)

References

External links 

 Iraqi Federal Police official website
 Policing Post-War Iraq: Insurgency, Civilian Police, and the Reconstruction of Society - By Mathieu Deflem and Suzanne Sutphin, published in Sociological Focus, Vol. 39(4), November 2006.
 Iraqi police deaths 'hit 12,000'
 Fixing the Interior Ministry and Police in Iraq USIP September 2007
 PBS FRONTLINE: GANGS OF IRAQ April 17, 2007

Iraqi Police